The tallero was the currency of Eritrea between 1890 and 1921. It was worth five lire and was subdivided into ten decimi (sing. decimo).

Five lire coins, engraved by Filippo Speranza, feature Umberto I of Italy with the lettering UMBERTO I RE D'ITALIA · 1896 on the obverse, and an eagle with a shield on the reverse. They weigh 28.1250g with an actual silver weight of 0.7234oz of .800 fineness, and are 40mmin diameter with a thickness of 3.1mm.  

From 1885, banknotes denominated in lire were issued by the Italian colonial authorities. In 1890, the silver tallero, patterned after the Maria Theresa thaler, was introduced (together with 50 centesimi, 1 and 2 lire coins). The last tallero were minted in 1918. In 1921, the tallero was abandoned and Italian currency circulated alone until banknotes were issued in lire in 1938.

References

Modern obsolete currencies
1890 establishments in Eritrea
1921 disestablishments in Eritrea
Economy of Eritrea
History of Eritrea